Darrell Antony Sweet (16 May 1947 – 30 April 1999) was an English drummer for the Scottish hard rock band Nazareth. He was a co-founder of Nazareth, which was formed in 1968.

Nazareth
Sweet was born in Bournemouth, England. His early years were spent playing with the Burntisland pipe band. He was also one of the members of The Shadettes that later became Nazareth.

As a founding member of Nazareth, he played hard rock drums from 1969 until his death in 1999. He played drums on Nazareth's first 20 albums.

Death
Sweet died of a heart attack in 1999, as the band prepared to set out on the second leg of its U.S. tour in support of their latest album, Boogaloo. The band had arrived at Indiana's New Albany Amphitheater when the 51-year-old Sweet began to feel ill. Within minutes he had gone into cardiac arrest. He was taken to Floyd Memorial Hospital in New Albany, where doctors pronounced him dead. Sweet was survived by his wife, Marion, and their son and daughter. He was replaced in the band by Pete Agnew's son, Lee Agnew.

Discography
With Nazareth
 Nazareth (1971)
 Exercises (1972)
 Razamanaz (1973)
 Loud 'n' Proud (1973)
 Rampant (1974)
 Hair of the Dog (1975)
 Close Enough for Rock 'n' Roll (1976)
 Play 'n' the Game (1976)
 Expect No Mercy (1977)
 No Mean City (1979)
 Malice in Wonderland (1980)
 The Fool Circle (1981)
 2XS (1982)
 Sound Elixir (1983)
 The Catch (1984)
 Cinema (1986)
 Snakes 'n' Ladders (1989)
 No Jive (1991)
 Move Me (1994)
 Boogaloo (1998)

References

1947 births
1999 deaths
Scottish rock drummers
British male drummers
Nazareth (band) members
People from Burntisland
20th-century British musicians
20th-century drummers
20th-century British male musicians
Blues rock musicians